Onobasulu is a Papuan language of Papua New Guinea. Half of its speakers are monolingual.

References 

Bosavi languages
Languages of Southern Highlands Province